Eidvatnet or Eidevatnet is a lake that is located in Bindal Municipality in Nordland county, Norway.  The  lake lies in the northern part of Bindal that is very sparsely populated.  The lake Fjellvatnet flows to the southwest into this lake.

See also
 List of lakes in Norway
 Geography of Norway

References

Lakes of Nordland
Bindal